Robin Peak is a sharply defined rocky summit (270 m) which is the northernmost peak on Signy Island in the South Orkney Islands. It was named by the United Kingdom Antarctic Place-Names Committee (UK-APC) in 1954 for Gordon de Quetteville Robin of the Falkland Islands Dependencies Survey (FIDS), the leader at Signy Island base in 1947, who made the first detailed survey of the island.

Mountains of the South Orkney Islands